Emmett Orlando King (October 8, 1875 – October 20, 1934) was an American football player and coach.  He served as the head football coach at the University of Maine in 1904 and compiled a 5–4 record.  King later worked as an attorney in Indiana until his death from a heart attack in 1934.

Head coaching record

References

External links
 

1875 births
1934 deaths
19th-century players of American football
American football centers
Harvard Crimson football players
Indiana Hoosiers football players
Maine Black Bears football coaches
People from Huntington, Indiana
People from Greencastle, Indiana
Coaches of American football from Indiana
Players of American football from Indiana